Teleogramma is an African genus of cichlids with five species. These dark and slender fish barely reach  in length and are limited to rapids in the Western Congo River basin in DR Congo/Congo Brazzaville. They are distinctive, with specialized anatomy. They are characterized by elongated heads with tubular nostrils and a lateral line that is not interrupted, as it is in most cichlids.

Species
There are five recognized species in this genus:
 Teleogramma brichardi Poll, 1959
 Teleogramma depressa T. R. Roberts & D. J. Stewart, 1976
 Teleogramma gracile Boulenger, 1899
 Teleogramma monogramma (Pellegrin, 1927)
 Teleogramma obamaorum Stiassny & S. E. Alter, 2015 – Obama's teleogramma

References

Chromidotilapiini
Cichlid fish of Africa
Cichlid genera
Taxa named by George Albert Boulenger